Jerome Barry Willis (23 October 1928 – 11 January 2014) was a British stage and screen actor with more than 100 screen credits to his name.

Willis had a leading role in the ITV drama series The Sandbaggers as Matthew Peele. He also appeared in Z Cars as DCS Richards, Within These Walls as Charles Radley, and Doctor Who as corporate polluter Stevens in The Green Death. He played Praetorian Guard commander Macro in the ITV Roman series The Caesars. Other television appearances include the cult children's television series Freewheelers as the manic Professor Nero, and the science fiction police drama Space Precinct as Captain Podley.

In 2002 Willis appeared with the Royal Shakespeare Company, in Pericles at the Roundhouse in London.

His film credits included Siege of the Saxons (1963), A Jolly Bad Fellow (1964), Khartoum (1966), The Magus (1968), Doomwatch (1972), Yellow Dog (1973), Winstanley (1975), Lifeforce (1985), God's Outlaw (1986), Sherlock Holmes and the Leading Lady (1991), Incident at Victoria Falls (1992) and Orlando (1992).

Early career 
Jerome Willis started his career as a newsreader, disc jockey and actor when he was posted to Ceylon, now Sri Lanka, in 1946 as a part of his national service in the Royal Air Force. He served in communications for the Ceylonese station Radio SEAC

On his return to London in 1948, he was accepted as a student at the Old Vic school, ran by Michel Saint-Denis, Fellow students included Joan Plowright and Prunella Scales. Upon graduating in 1951, he joined the West of England Touring Company, alongside fellow student Plowright.

Filmography

References

External links

Obituary in Doctor Who online

1928 births
2014 deaths
English male film actors
English male television actors